Nook Farm may refer to:

Nook Farm (Manchester), an estate of council houses in Syke, Rochdale, England
Nook Farm (Connecticut), a historical neighborhood in Asylum Hill, Hartford, Connecticut, United States